Guram Sherozia (born 29 November 1989) is a Georgian TV presenter, Blogger, traveler, marketer and lecturer.

Sherozia was born in Poti, Georgia. Graduated Tbilisi State University, than became master at Georgian Institute of Public Affairs, after that continued his study and research on PhD program of Ilia State University.

He started his academic career since 2011 at Ilia State University as well as working on his first managerial position at TBC Bank JSC.

Later in 2013 he opened his blog and became TV presenter of business program at Palitra TV. Later he is becoming TV presenter of one of the most popular TV in Georgia - Imedi's morning program. In 2017 he already had his own TV program at Georgian Public Broadcaster.

References

External links
Blog
page on Facebook
on Instagram

1989 births
Living people
People from Samegrelo-Zemo Svaneti
Journalists from Georgia (country)